Jaguar Field is a softball field located on the University of South Alabama campus in Mobile, Alabama.  The facility is the home field of the University of South Alabama Jaguars softball team and host of the 2010 Sun Belt Conference softball tournament. The complex was built in 2006 for the University of South Alabama Jaguars softball team's inaugural season in 2007.

External links
 University of South Alabama Jaguars Athletics official website

South Alabama Jaguars sports venues
College softball venues in the United States
South Alabama Jaguars softball
2007 establishments in Alabama
Sports venues completed in 2007